The Olyutor Range is a range of mountains in Kamchatka Krai, Russian Far East. Administratively the range is part of Olyutorsky District.

The range is a mainland prolongation of the submerged Shirshov Ridge of the Bering Sea.

Geography
The Olyutor Range is a coastal mountain chain, with its eastern flank facing the Bering Sea. It is part of the Koryak Highland system. Despite the relatively small height of the range, its mountains have an alpine character with sharp, pointed ridgetops and steep slopes covered with scree. Deep river gorges and glacial valleys are widespread.

To the north rises the Snegovoy Range and the southern part of the range forms the Olyutor Peninsula, jutting southwards with the Olyutor Gulf to the west. The southern end of the peninsula is Cape Olyutor (Mys Olyutorsky).

Climate and flora
The climate is influenced by the ocean. Summers are short and cool, with frequent fog and rains. Winters are long and cold, often windy, frosts are relatively rare. 

The mountains are covered with dwarf forests, Erman's birch groves, meadows and coastal tundra.

See also
Bering tundra
List of mountains and hills of Russia

References

External links
The Olutor (Kamchatka, Russia) 20 April 2006 earthquake
Mountain - Russia
Koryak Mountains
Landforms of Siberia

pl:Góry Olutorskie
ru:Олюторский хребет